Martha Nelson-Grant (born 22 October 1954) is a Canadian former swimmer. She competed in the women's 200 metre individual medley at the 1972 Summer Olympics.

References

External links
 

1954 births
Living people
Canadian female medley swimmers
Olympic swimmers of Canada
Swimmers at the 1972 Summer Olympics
Sportspeople from Saskatoon